Chen Wei (born May 1966) is a Chinese food scientist currently serving as vice-president of Jiangnan University.

Biography
Chen was born in May 1966 in Jiangdu County, Jiangsu. He earned a bachelor's degree in 1988, a master's degree in 1995, and a doctor's degree in 2003, all from Jiangnan University. After graduation, he taught at the university, where he was promoted to associate professor in 2003 and to full professor in 2006. He was a visiting scholar at Wake Forest University in 2007 and the University of California in 2014.

Honours and awards
 2011 National Science Fund for Distinguished Young Scholars 
 2012 "Chang Jiang Scholar" (or " Yangtze River Scholar")
 2018 National Technology Invention Award (Second Class)
 November 22, 2019 Member of the Chinese Academy of Engineering (CAE)

References

External links
Chen Wei on Jiangnan University  

1966 births
Living people
People from Yangzhou
Jiangnan University alumni
Academic staff of Jiangnan University
Members of the Chinese Academy of Engineering
Chinese food scientists